Il était une fois... les Amériques (English, Once Upon a Time... The Americas) is a French animated TV series from 1991 directed by Albert Barillé. It is part of the Once Upon a Time... franchise. The show aired in the United States on the History Channel in January–March 1995.

Synopsis
The series, aimed at children, tell the story of the American continent through all its settlements (Eskimos, Aztecs, Incas, etc.) and their historical events (conquest of the West, American Revolutionary War, etc.).

Episodes
The First Americans
The Hunters
The Conquerors of the Great North
The Promised Land
The Tumulus Builders
The Aztecs before the Conquest
Christopher Columbus' Dream
America!
Cortes and the Aztecs
Que viva Mexico!
Pizarro and the Inca Empire
Jacques Cartier
The Age of the Conquistadores
Champlain
England and the Thirteen Colonies
The Indians in the 17th Century
The Indians in the 18th Century
The End of the French Dream
The 13 Colonies Towards Independence
The War of Independence
Ebony Wood (slavery)
The Pioneers
Simon Bolivar
The Gold Rush
The End of the Indian People
Towards the 20th Century

See also
 List of French animated television series

References

External links
Official website for Procidis, the series' producer

 Hello Mastero at YouTube

1991 French television series debuts
1991 French television series endings
Historical television series
French children's animated education television series
1990s French animated television series
Television series set in the Pre-Columbian era
Television series about the history of the United States
Television series about the history of Canada
Films about Native Americans
Television series set in the 15th century
Television series set in the 16th century
Television series set in the 17th century
Television series set in the 18th century
Television series set in the 19th century
Television series set in the 20th century
Canal+ original programming
Cultural depictions of Christopher Columbus
Cultural depictions of Hernán Cortés
Cultural depictions of Francisco Pizarro
Cultural depictions of George Washington
Cultural depictions of Benjamin Franklin
Cultural depictions of Thomas Jefferson
Cultural depictions of Abraham Lincoln
Cultural depictions of John Wilkes Booth
Cultural depictions of Simón Bolívar